Jennifer Louise Johnson is an American Christian worship singer, songwriter and worship pastor. She is a co-founding member of Bethel Music, and is one-half of the husband-and-wife worship duo, Brian & Jenn Johnson. She is also a senior worship pastor at Bethel Church in Redding, California, and a Senior Overseer of WorshipU, an online school of worship under Bethel Music which she co-founded with Brian Johnson.

She is the daughter-in-law of Bethel pastor Bill Johnson. As a part of Brian & Jenn Johnson, three live albums have been released: Undone (2001), We Believe (2006), the duo's first release to appear on Billboards Christian Albums chart, and Where You Go I Go (2008). The duo has also released one studio album, After All These Years (2017), which debuted on the US Billboard 200 at number 21. Jenn Johnson has also featured on many Bethel Music collective albums.

Early life
Jennifer Louise Rock was born on April 15, 1982 in Eureka, California, to Ronald Rock and Sandra Brown.

Career
In 2000, Brian Johnson and his wife, Jenn Johnson, were appointed as senior worship pastors at Bethel Church. As Brian & Jenn Johnson, they released their debut album, Undone, in 2001, featuring Johnson's younger sister Leah Valenzuela. After a five-year hiatus, Brian & Jenn Johnson released their second live album, We Believe on September 26, 2006. We Believe charted at No. 48 on the Billboard Top Christian Albums Chart, becoming the duo's first chart entry. On September 30, 2008, Where You Go I Go, the duo's third album, was released via the label Ion Records.

On December 13, 2011, Bethel Music and Jenn Johnson released "Come to Me" as the lead single of Bethel's live album, The Loft Sessions (2012). The song peaked at number 14 on the US Christian Digital Songs Sales Chart. On September 6, 2013, "Chasing You" by Bethel Music, featuring Jenn Johnson's vocals, was released as the lead single of Bethel Music's first studio album, Tides (2013). The song peaked at number 13 on the US Christian Digital Songs Sales Chart.

Brian & Jenn Johnson released their fourth album, After All These Years, on January 27, 2017. The album debuted at number one on the Top Christian Albums chart having sold 16,000 equivalent album units in its first week of sales, while becoming the duo's first chart-topping album. On May 8, 2017, Jenn Johnson released "You're Gonna Be OK" as the lead single from After All These Years (2017). "You're Gonna Be OK" peaked at number 34 on the Hot Christian Songs chart.

On November 1, 2019, Johnson and Bethel Music released "Goodness of God" as the third single from Bethel's live album, Victory (2019). "Goodness of God" peaked at number 15 on the Hot Christian Songs chart. The song was nominated for the GMA Dove Award for Worship Recorded Song of the Year at the 2020 GMA Dove Awards.

On January 10, 2020, Jenn Johnson featured on the song "Famous For (I Believe)" released by Tauren Wells as the second single from Well's album, Citizen of Heaven (2020). The song peaked at number three on the Hot Christian Songs chart, registering as Johnson's first top ten single, and at number 15 on the Bubbling Under Hot 100 chart. "Famous For (I Believe)" was nominated for Grammy Award for Best Contemporary Christian Music Performance/Song at the 2021 Grammy Awards, and the Billboard Music Award for Top Christian Song at the 2021 Billboard Music Awards. On February 7, 2020, Jenn Johnson, alongside Brian Johnson and Bethel Music released "God of Revival" as the lead single to Bethel's live album, Revival's in the Air (2020). "God of Revival" peaked at number 22 on the Hot Christian Songs chart. On April 18, 2020, Jenn Johnson featured on the single "Joy Invincible" released by Switchfoot. "Joy Invincible" peaked at number 37 on the Hot Christian Songs chart.

Discography

Albums
As Brian & Jenn Johnson
 Undone (2001)
 We Believe (2006)
 Where You Go I Go (2008)
 After All These Years (2017)

Singles

As lead artist

As featured artist

Other charted songs

Promotional singles

Other appearances

Bibliography

Awards and nominations

Billboard Music Awards

! 
|-
| 2021 
| "Famous For (I Believe)" 
| Top Christian Song 
| 
| 
|}

GMA Dove Awards

! 
|-
| 2015
| "Forever (We Sing Hallelujah)"
| Worship Recorded Song of the Year
| 
| 
|-
| 2020
| "Goodness of God"
| Worship Recorded Song of the Year
| 
| 
|-
| rowspan="2" | 2022
| "You're Gonna Be OK"
| Inspirational Recorded Song of the Year
| 
| rowspan="2" | 
|-
| "Goodness of God - Live"
| Gospel Worship Recorded Song of the Year
| 
|-
|}

Grammy Awards

! 
|-
| 2021
| "Famous For (I Believe)"
| Best Contemporary Christian Music Performance/Song
| 
| 
|-
| 2023
| "Holy Forever"
| Best Contemporary Christian Music Performance/Song
| 
| 
|-
|}

Notes

References

External links
  on Bethel Music

1982 births
Living people
20th-century Christians
21st-century Christians
21st-century American singers
American Charismatics
American women singer-songwriters
American performers of Christian music
Composers of Christian music
Christian music songwriters
People from Eureka, California
Performers of contemporary worship music
Singer-songwriters from California